is a Japanese footballer who plays as a midfielder for Ventforet Kofu.

Club career

FC Tokyo
Nozawa made his debut for FC Tokyo on 23 March 2013 against Kashima Antlers in the J.League Cup at the Kashima Soccer Stadium in which he started and played 62 minutes before being substituted  for Hirotaka Mita as FC Tokyo won the match 4–2.

International
Nozawa participated with the Japan U17s during the 2011 FIFA U-17 World Cup in which he played two matches against Jamaica U17s and the Argentina U17s.

Career statistics

Club
Updated to end of 2018 season.

References

External links 

Profile at FC Gifu
Profile at FC Tokyo

1994 births
Living people
Association football people from Saitama Prefecture
Japanese footballers
Japan youth international footballers
J1 League players
J2 League players
J3 League players
FC Tokyo players
FC Tokyo U-23 players
J.League U-22 Selection players
FC Gifu players
Ehime FC players
Ventforet Kofu players
Footballers at the 2014 Asian Games
Association football midfielders
Asian Games competitors for Japan